The EFDA Nations Cup, was a Country vs Country competition for Formula Opel cars between 1990 and 1998. It had always been Dan Partel's dream to stage a race that pitted drivers in equal cars racing for their country. The Formula Opel/Vauxhall one make racing series offered the best opportunity for such an event.

The 1990 EFDA Nations Cup (Nation Cup I) was held at Spa-Francorchamps, Belgium (19–20 July 1990).

Final positions

References

External links
 Fastlines International
 Driver Database

EFDA Nations Cup
EFDA Nations Cup seasons
EFDA Nations Cup